Sergiolus gertschi is a species of ground spider in the family Gnaphosidae. It is found in the USA and Mexico.

References

Further reading

 
 
 

Gnaphosidae
Spiders described in 1981